"Something Worth Leaving Behind" is a song written by Brett Beavers and Tom Douglas, and recorded by American country music artist Lee Ann Womack.  It was released in May 2002 as the first single and title track from her album of the same name.  The song peaked at number 20 on the Billboard Hot Country Singles & Tracks.

Background
Womack told Billboard, "It's a good message and one that I am glad to deliver. I hope to have a lot of those kinds of songs over the course of my career."

Critical reception
Chuck Taylor of Billboard gave the song a positive review and wrote, "The outstanding song has a haunting, memorable melody and a great lyric, starting with the opening lines. It's a lyric with a poignant sentiment, and Womack delivers it beautifully. She possesses one of the most compelling country female voices to come along in quite a while-vulnerable one minute, compelling and gutsy the next. This should quickly become the next hit on what will no doubt become a lengthy parade for this talented artist."

Chart performance
The song debuted at number 54 during the week of May 24, 2002.

References

2002 singles
2002 songs
Lee Ann Womack songs
Songs written by Brett Beavers
Songs written by Tom Douglas (songwriter)
MCA Nashville Records singles
Song recordings produced by Frank Liddell